Just a Kiss may refer to:

Film and Television 
 Just a Kiss (film), a 2002 dark comedy directed by Fisher Stevens
 Just a Kiss or Ae Fond Kiss..., a 2004 romantic drama film directed by Ken Loach
 "Just a Kiss", a 1999 episode of Casualty

Music 
 "Just a Kiss" (song), a 2011 song by Lady Antebellum
 "Just a Kiss", a song by School Gyrls from the album School Gyrls, 2010
 "Just a Kiss", a 2009 song by Mishon Ratliff

See also 
 Just One Kiss (disambiguation)